The Yamaha DX27 is a full sized key version of the Yamaha DX100. It was released in 1985 and manufactured in Japan. The DX27S is the same synth, with built in speakers, stereo output, chorus fx and internal power supply.

Keyboard
The DX27 features 61 unweighted full sized keys without velocity or aftertouch. (Synth engine can receive and process velocity data via MIDI IN).

Memory
The unit features 192 presets, 24 user presets.

Sounds
The DX27 is most notable for its "solid bass" sound (Patch PB 01).

Notable users

 Mica Nikolic
 Casino Versus Japan

See also
 Yamaha DX7

References

External links

DX27
Polyphonic synthesizers
Digital synthesizers